Thoman is a surname and given name. Notable people with the name include: 

surname;
Camille Thoman, American performance artist, filmmaker, and writer
István Thomán (1862–1940), Hungarian piano virtuoso and music educator
Nick Thoman (born 1986), American swimmer

given name;
Thoman Burgkmair, father-in-law of Hans Holbein the elder

See also
Thomann (disambiguation)